Petrophila hodgesi is a moth in the family Crambidae. It was described by Eugene G. Munroe in 1972. It is found in North America, where it has been recorded from Arkansas and Oklahoma.

References

Petrophila
Moths described in 1972